Heteropygas is a genus of moths of the family Erebidae. The genus was erected by Achille Guenée in 1852.

Species
Heteropygas albicauda Köhler, 1979
Heteropygas angulum Giacomelli, 1911
Heteropygas biangulata Walker, 1865
Heteropygas dognini Giacomelli, 1911
Heteropygas filena Schaus, 1901
Heteropygas nymbides Hampson, 1926
Heteropygas oppilata Guenée, 1852
Heteropygas ziczac Felder, 1874

References

Calpinae